= Popular and Social League of the Great Sahara Tribes =

The Popular and Social League of the Great Sahara Tribes is a movement comprising traditional and religious leaders from 21 African and Asian countries (such as Iraq, Egypt, Syria, Jordan, Mali, Eritrea, Chad, Libya, Morocco, Sudan, Somalia, Djibouti, and Mauritania). It was launched in 2006 in Timbuktu under the aegis of Libyan leader Muammar Gaddafi.

In 2011, the society called for preservation of social ties with its neighboring countries.
